Amir Jan Sabori is a singer, musician, composer, and poet from Herat, Afghanistan.  There is a documentary about him called Golden Dream. Amir Jan Sabori had a long hiatus in his career but returned in 2005 with his album This Is Life. He is also the uncle of emerging singer Tawab Arash and has done production for him.

Discography 
2005: This Is Life (Persian: زندگی همین است Zindagi Hameen Ast)

References 

Living people
Pashtun people
People from Herat
Afghan Tajik people
Afghan male singers
Persian-language poets
Persian-language singers
Afghan expatriates in Canada
Year of birth missing (living people)